The Homerun Range is a northwest-trending mountain range, 45 km (28 mi) long and 3 to 11 km (2 to 7 mi) wide, east of Everett Range at the heads of the Ebbe and Tucker glaciers in Victoria Land, Antarctica.

Its name derives from "Homerun Bluff," a field name of the southern party of NZFMCAE, 1962–63, used to denote a turning point in their traverse at this range to the airlift point and return to Scott Base. The entire range was mapped by the USGS from surveys and U.S. Navy air photos from 1960 to 1963.

The range's mountains include Mount LeResche (2040m) and Mount Shelton (2485m).

References

Mountain ranges of Victoria Land